Miami Senior High School, also known as Miami High School, is a public high school located at 2450 SW 1st Street in Miami, Florida, and operated by Miami-Dade County Public Schools. Founded in 1903, it is one of the oldest high schools in Miami-Dade County. The school building is famous for its architecture and is a historic landmark.  Miami Senior High School has a rich alumni base, with many graduates of the high school going on to varied, prominent careers. The high school originally served the earliest settling families of Miami in the first half of the 20th century. By the late 1960s, with an increase in Miami's population, its student body grew at a fast pace.

History
Miami Senior High School was established in 1903 and was the first high school in Miami-Dade County. Originally, high school classes took place in Miami's first schoolhouse, a two-story frame structure that was built in 1898 on what is now NE 1st Avenue, between 3rd and 4th Streets.  This building, considered temporary, was a one-story frame bungalow addition built directly behind the existing schoolhouse.  It opened its doors on September 18, 1905, with 29 girls and 20 boys in attendance.

In 1909, the school board decided to build a new schoolhouse to again house all grammar and high school students together. In 1911, a new three-story concrete schoolhouse opened its doors.  The original one-story high school building was moved to SW 12th Street and 1st Avenue, repainted, and opened as the Southside Elementary School. After a new Southside Elementary School was constructed in 1914, the original high school building fell into decades of neglect, operating as a boarding house for 90 years.  It was "discovered" in 1983 by a local historian and, in January 2003, was moved to its current location in Southside Park, where it has since been renovated and opened as a community center.

Miami Senior High School's current building is its fourth home.  The school board selected a fifteen-acre campus in the middle of what was then a pine forest.  Groundbreaking occurred early in 1926, but due to the Great Miami Hurricane of 1926, the school's opening was delayed. Finally finished in 1928, the building was designed in a Spanish Mediterranean style with Moorish and Byzantine details by Richard Kiehnel of Kiehnel and Elliott, one of the great early Miami architects.  He gave the school an impressive entrance off Flagler Street "of three arched portals befitting a Gothic cathedral," according to the American Institute of Architects' Miami architecture guide.  The building is listed on the U.S. National Register of Historic Places.

1968 was a significant year for Miami Senior High School. Structural changes were made to accommodate a newly installed air conditioning system that closed off the building's high ceilings.  The original windows on the building were sealed with bricks before the completion of the work, and students suffered in hot classrooms for a large portion of the year. This was also the year of the major Florida statewide teachers' strike, which caused students classes to be in chaos due to having many newly hired substitute teachers, while their regular teachers walked picket lines for weeks.

Demographics
Located in the Little Havana neighborhood, the school was founded in 1903. Since the late 1960s, the high school has traditionally had a Cuban-American majority. Today, a growing number of students are of Central American descent, reflecting demographic changes in Little Havana since the 1990s.

As of 2013, Miami Senior High School is 94% Hispanic (primarily Cuban, Honduran, Guatemalan, and Salvadorean), 3% White (non-Hispanic), and 3% Black.

By the 1950s, a large Jewish minority had developed at Miami Senior High School, and Jews made up the majority of the students in some advanced-level classes. During that decade some Jewish students were in the attendance zone for Coral Gables Senior High School but were instead sent to Miami High; this was especially the case with girls, as many high status girls' clubs at Coral Gables High did not admit Jews. A patio called "Little Jerusalem" or "LJ" (initially "Little Israel" in the 1950s) was where Jewish students socialized.

In 1984, the student newspaper declared Spanglish the official language of Miami Senior High School. Then, like today, most students at the school spoke fluent Spanish and English. 69% of the school's students graduate, and it has an overall dropout rate of 4%.

Historic architectural restoration

Beginning in 2010, Miami Senior High School underwent a four-year historic restoration, renovation, and remodeling project at a cost of approximately $55 million. Project architect Thorn Grafton of Zyscovich Architects, who is the grandson of Miami Beach pioneering architect Russell Pancoast, was one of the people who undertook the renovation project. Completed in April 2014, the project did away with the dropped ceilings that had accommodated an old air conditioning system, and restored the original high ceilings and decorative cast-stone vent screens in the halls.  It also reopened the original second story arcade, removed an office expansion that had blocked part of the courtyard, and restored the original 14-foot arched windows and steel-trussed cathedral ceiling in the old library (now a media center).

Notable alumni
 Rudy Árias - former major league baseball catcher and coach. 
 Desi Arnaz - bandleader, actor, TV producer, star of I Love Lucy
 Atari Bigby - NFL, Green Bay Packers
 Steve Blake - Former NBA player, Did not graduate
 Eddie Brown - NFL player
 Jeff Coopwood - Emmy-nominated actor, broadcaster and singer
 John Dasburg - CEO of Burger King
 Jim Dooley - NFL head coach and player, Chicago Bears
 Allen Edwards - college basketball player and coach
 Doug Edwards - NBA player, Atlanta Hawks
 Robert L. Floyd -  former Mayor of Miami, State Representative, Judge, and Miami Sheriff
 Luis Garcia - MLB player, Baltimore Orioles
Christopher George (1929–1983) - film and television actor, star of The Rat Patrol and U.S. Marine
 Edmond J. Gong - first Asian American elected to Florida House and Senate
 Bob Graham - Governor of Florida and U.S. Senator
 Philip L. Graham - publisher of Washington Post
 Anthony Grant - head basketball coach, University of Dayton
 Carol Hanson - Florida State Representative (1982-1994) and Mayor of Boca Raton (1995-2001)
 Udonis Haslem - NBA player, Miami Heat; 3-time NBA champion
 Steve Hertz - MLB player and Israel Baseball League manager
 Lindy Infante - NFL head coach, Green Bay Packers and Indianapolis Colts
 Jamaal Jackson - NFL center
 Andre Johnson - NFL wide receiver, Houston Texans and Tennessee Titans
 Lonnie Johnson – NFL player
 Donald Justice - Pulitzer Prize-winning poet
 Veronica Lake -  actress, star of such 1940s films as Sullivan's Travels and This Gun for Hire
 Mike Levy - founder and former CEO of SportsLine.com, now CBSSports.com 
 Marquand Manuel - NFL player, defensive coordinator of Atlanta Falcons
 Frank Martin - head basketball coach, UMass 
Delrish Moss - Miami law enforcement veteran appointed as Police Chief of Ferguson, Missouri, a suburb of St. Louis known for racial unrest
 Gardnar Mulloy - tennis player, 4-time U.S. Open doubles champion
 Alfred Browning Parker - architect
 Roscoe Parrish - NFL wide receiver, San Diego Chargers
 Juan Pena, MLB player, Boston Red Sox
 Ed Roberts - designed first commercially successful personal computer in 1975
 Mandy Romero- MLB player (San Diego Padres, Boston Red Sox, Colorado Rockies)
 Al Rosen (1924-2015) - MLB player, 4-time All-Star, 1948 World Series champion, 1953 MVP
 Mike Schemer (1917–1983) - MLB player
 Robert L. Shevin - Former Florida Attorney General, Member of the Florida Senate and Florida House of Representatives; 3rd District Court of Appeals Judge
 David A. Siegel - businessman
 George Smathers - U.S. Senator
 Bob Stinson - MLB player for six teams
 Mario Valdez - MLB player (Chicago White Sox, Oakland Athletics)
 Brent Wright - professional basketball player in Europe
 Ileana Garcia - Member of the Florida Senate

In pop culture
Movies including The Substitute and Porky's were filmed at MHS, as well as the music videos for Gloria Estefan and NSYNC's "Music of My Heart" and Drake's "God's Plan".

See also
Education in the United States

References

External links

Miami Senior High School website

Educational institutions established in 1903
Miami-Dade County Public Schools high schools
High schools in Miami
National Register of Historic Places in Miami
Mediterranean Revival architecture in Florida
Kiehnel and Elliott buildings
1903 establishments in Florida